Prospect Hummer is an EP by Animal Collective released in May 2005. It is an accompaniment to Sung Tongs.

On a Europe tour in the middle of 2004, the group was introduced to the British folk singer Vashti Bunyan in Edinburgh, Scotland, by Kieran Hebden (Four Tet). Bunyan finally contributed vocals to all of the songs except for "Baleen Sample". Avey Tare, Panda Bear and Deakin are present throughout the entire EP; Geologist, who could not join the tour because of his dayjob, is featured only on the song "Baleen Sample". They had three days to record three songs.

The first two songs are outtakes from the Sung Tongs recording sessions, re-recorded with Bunyan.

Bunyan says about the recordings:

The release in 2005 led to a Fat Cat Records signing for Vashti Bunyan, who finally wrote, recorded and released her second album Lookaftering, ending a thirty-year hiatus.

Critical reception

Prospect Hummer was welcomed with general warmth from music reviewers. 

For No Ripcord, Ben Bollig applauded it as a "luscious and simple ... EP that showcases the best of both artists."

Track listing

Personnel

Musicians
 Vashti Bunyan - vocals (1-2, 4)
Animal Collective
 Avey Tare - guitar, piano (1-2, 4)
 Deakin - guitar, vocals (1-2, 4)
 Geologist - sampler (on "Baleen Sample")
 Panda Bear - guitar, vocals (1-2, 4)

Technical
 Anthony Whiting - recording
 Rusty Santos - mastering, mixing, recording

References

2005 debut EPs
Animal Collective EPs
FatCat Records EPs